Jessica Berscheid (born 30 July 1997) is a Luxembourgish footballer who plays as a defender and has appeared for the Luxembourg women's national team.

Career
Berscheid has been capped for the Luxembourg national team, appearing for the team during the 2019 FIFA Women's World Cup qualifying cycle.

References

External links
 
 
 

1997 births
Living people
Luxembourgian women's footballers
Luxembourg women's international footballers
Women's association football defenders